James McEwen may refer to:
James McEwen (footballer), English footballer and coach
James McEwen (engineer) (born 1948), biomedical engineer
James McEwen (politician), predecessor of Thomas Corwin
Sir James McEwen, 2nd Baronet (1924–1971) of the McEwen baronets
Sir James McEwen, 4th Baronet (1960–1983) of the McEwen baronets

See also
James McEwan (disambiguation)